Mario Maurer is a Thai actor and model. He was in the 2007 film The Love of Siam and the 2010 sleeper hit Crazy Little Thing Called Love. He was also in Thailand's highest grossing film of all time, Pee Mak alongside Davika Hoorne. He was part of a group called 4+1 Channel 3 Superstar with actors Nadech Kugimiya, Prin Suparat, Pakorn Chatborirak and Phupoom Pongpanu.

Early life and education 
Maurer was born to a German father and a Thai Chinese mother. He has an older brother named Marco, who is now a Thai rapper. Maurer graduated from Saint Dominic School and earned his bachelor's degree from the Faculty of Law, Ramkhamhaeng University. In 2017, he received his master's degree in Political Communication from Krirk University.

Modelling and film career 
At 16 years old, Maurer was approached at Siam Square to try out modeling. From then on, he started doing photo shoots, commercials and music videos. In 2007, he made his feature film debut in a leading role in The Love of Siam, written and directed by Chukiat Sakweerakul. The role "Tong" brought him many accolades and instant fame far beyond Thailand's borders. Commenting on his new-found fame, "I didn't want to do it, acting wasn't on my to-do list." He decided to do the movie because he trusted director Chukiat and the movie would give him many opportunities. He would be making money to help his family. He became famous in this film because of his gay role.

He won the Best Actor award in the Starpics Thai Films Awards, and was also nominated in the Bangkok Critics Assembly and Star Entertainment Awards.

Director Bhandit Rittakol had approached Maurer for Boonchu 9, but he was tied up with other projects. He was cast in the 2008 film by Chatchai Naksuriya, Friendship. The film is set around 1983. Maurer starred opposite Apinya Sakuljaroensuk, as 12th grade student. That same year, he appeared in a segment of the four-story anthology 4 Romance, (segment "Joob" or Kiss) directed by Rashane Limtrakul. Maurer's projects after 2008 included a comedy-horror film written and directed by Yuthlert Sippapak,  Rahtree Reborn, scheduled for release in April 2009, in which he starred opposite Chermarn Boonyasak.

Maurer gained popularity after he starred in the 2010 film First Love and Thailand's highest grossing film of all time, Pee Mak.

Other work 

Maurer teamed up with his older brother Marco in the hip hop duo "PsyCho & Lil'Mario". They released their debut PsyCho & Lil'Mario: Dem Crazy Boyz on 31 October 2007. Maurer worked as a hypeman in this album. He would later on describe it as "just for fun. I know myself – I'm not a singer. That's not my dream."

Maurer participated in endorsements for the first time for Exit Rollon and other popular brands such as The Pizza Company, Sugus, and Foremost. He was also the presenter for Honda Jazz, and was in the cloud 9 commercial by Unilever company. He also did endorsements for Pepsi, Dutchmill, and Sony Ericsson. In July 2011, he signed an endorsement contract for the Philippine clothing brand Penshoppe, following the unexpected popularity from his film Crazy Little Thing Called Love shown on the ABS-CBN network. He also signed a movie contract with Star Cinema, a Philippine film production company. He was paired with Filipina film and television actress Erich Gonzales in the film released in 2012, Suddenly It's Magic. On 28 October 2011, Maurer had a press and fan conference at the Philippine International Convention Center with thousands of fans in attendance, as a part of his official launch as a Penshoppe endorser. On 29 October, he hit the runway at the Philippine Fashion Week held at the SMX Convention Center. On 3 August 2013, Maurer returned to the Philippines to promote his movie Pee Mak and had a fan conference at two venues, SM North EDSA and SM Mall of Asia the following day with Baifern Pimchanok, as part of Pimchanok's official launch as Penshoppe endorser. Thousands of fans were in attendance in continuing support for both stars and their 2010 hit movie First Love.

Personal life 
Maurer's personal interests include skateboarding, hip hop, and driving cars. He is also a naturist. Although he is of German descent, he doesn't speak German.
He understands basic words and phrases in Mandarin as he studied the language while he was in high school. His father Roland Maurer died of a diabetes-related heart attack on 27 June 2011. He has a very close relationship with his brother Marco, a hip-hop artist and actor.

Filmography

Films

Television series

Ost. 
 Movies : Pee Mak (พี่มาก..พระโขนง)
 Songs : (ขอมือเธอหน่อย(cover version) ร้องร่วมกับ ณัฏฐพงษ์ ชาติพงศ์, พงศธร จงวิลาส, อัฒรุต คงราศรี และ กันตพัฒน์ สีดา) On Air YouTube:GTHchannel
 Dramas : Bunlang Dok Mai (บัลลังก์ดอกไม้)
 Songs : (กลัวจะเผลอรักเธอไปสักวัน ร้องร่วมกับ จรินทร์พร จุนเกียรติ) On Air YouTube:Ch3Thailand Music
 Songs : (ขอบคุณ (Acoustic Version)) On Air YouTube:Ch3Thailand Music
 Dramas : Bad Romeo (คือเธอ)
 Songs : Touch (Touch - ศดานันท์ บาเล็นซิเอก้า (Feat.)) On Air YouTube:Ch3Thailand Music

Music Video 
 2007 Pak Di Khi Ngao Aotae Chai - Mila (ปากดี ขี้เหงา เอาแต่ใจ - จามิล่า พันธ์พินิจ) (RS/YouTube:welovekamikaze) with

Awards and nominations

References

External links 

 
 

1988 births
Living people
Mario Maurer
Mario Maurer
Mario Maurer
Mario Maurer
Mario Maurer
Mario Maurer
Mario Maurer
Mario Maurer
Mario Maurer
Mario Maurer
Mario Maurer
Mario Maurer
Mario Maurer